Slovakia participated in the 2010 Summer Youth Olympics in Singapore.

The Slovak squad consisted of 17 athletes competing in 8 sports: aquatics (swimming), athletics, canoeing, fencing, judo, modern pentathlon, rowing and tennis.

Medalists

Athletics

Girls
Track and Road Events

Field Events

Canoeing

Boys

Fencing

Group Stage

Knock-Out Stage

Judo

Individual

Team

Modern pentathlon

Rowing

Swimming

Tennis

Singles

Doubles

References

External links
Competitors List: Slovakia

Nations at the 2010 Summer Youth Olympics
2010 in Slovak sport
Slovakia at the Youth Olympics